Campbell Street is a street in Hobart, Tasmania. It was named by Lachlan Macquarie for his wife, Elizabeth Henrietta Campbell.

See also

References

Streets in Hobart